Adamson Bratson Musanda  Mushala was a Zambian rebel leader who rebelled against the rule of the Zambian government of Kenneth Kaunda from 1975 to 1982 when he was shot by Zambia Army officers.

Rebellion 
Before his rebellion, Mushala initially belonged to the United National Independence Party (UNIP), fighting colonial minority rule.  He was sent to China for guerrilla training with a view to coming back to fight the colonial government, but upon his return, Zambia was already independent. He  demanded to be the Minister Of Tourism and Wildlife in the UNIP government, which Kaunda denied. Out of frustration, he left Zambia together with his followers and went to the then South West Africa (Namibia) under the control of South Africa. He advanced in his guerrilla training and in 1975, after inspiration from Jonas Savimbi of Angola, he came back to Zambia and rebelled against the UNIP government until 1982.
It was believed that Mushala was strongly believed to be surviving through a complexity of witchcraft and supernatural powers. There were some unconfirmed reports in Solwezi that the government had even hired some witchdoctors locally and abroad, to come and try to capture him but all was in vain.

Death 

Adamson Mushala was gunned down in 1982 in a military ambush in the remote areas of Northwestern Province near Solwezi, where his rebellion began with a post-independence dispute in the 1960s and ended with a bullet through his eye.
His body was paraded for public viewing at Solwezi General Hospital.

Aftermath 
After the death of Mushala, his second-in-command Alexander Saimbwende took over the reins and continued the fight until September 25, 1990, when he gave up after a dialogue with the then Member of the Central Committee for North Western Province Alexander Kamalondo. He was flown to Lusaka where he was later pardoned by President Dr. Kenneth Kaunda.

See also 
 Mwamba Luchembe
 Steven Lungu

References 

1982 deaths
20th-century Zambian people
1935 births